Cantanhede may refer to:

 Cantanhede, Portugal, a municipality in Coimbra District, Portugal
 Cantanhede, Maranhão, a municipality in Brazil

See also
 Marquis of Marialva, hereditary title of the Counts of Cantanhede